Sperata is a genus of bagrid catfishes.

Species 
There are currently six recognized species in this genus:
 Sperata acicularis Ferraris & Runge, 1999
 Sperata aor (F. Hamilton, 1822) - Long-whiskered catfish
 Sperata aorella (Blyth, 1858)
Sperata aorides 
Sperata lamarrii 
 Sperata seenghala (Sykes, 1839) - Giant river-catfish

Distribution
Species of Sperata are found in southern Asia from Afghanistan to Thailand where they are found in a wide variety of water bodies.

Relationship to humans
At least two of the Sperata species (S. aor & S. seenghala) are sport fish as well as being important food fish.

References

 
Bagridae
Fish of Asia
Catfish genera
Freshwater fish genera